Meet the Adebanjos is a single-camera sitcom created by Debra Odutuyo and Andrew Osayemi and produced by MTA Productions. Centred on a Nigerian-British family living in Peckham, South London the show focuses on the larger-than-life patriarch Bayo Adebanjo as he struggles to instill his old-fashioned African values within his reluctant British family.

The sitcom began as a revolutionary self-funded web series in 2011 and quickly became an international hit on televisions across the globe  as it was shown in countries like Nigeria, Ghana, South Africa and Uganda. Since its launch, the programme has gained a devoted following in the African-British community.

Production

Meet the Adebanjos began life in 2011 as a web series that was self-funded by the show’s creators, Andrew Osayemi and Deborah Odutayo. The comedy stems from the typical ups and downs of family life, and the patriarch Bayo's rivalry with the equally larger-than-life and rather eccentric Auntie Funke.

Cast and characters

Main cast and characters 
 Wale Ojo as Bayo Adebanjo
 Yetunde Oduwole as Gladys Adebanjo
 Andrea Ama Aboagye as Sade Adebanjo
 Daniel Davids as Tobi Adebanjo
 Moji Bamtefa as Aunty Funke
 Jordan Coulson as Kevin (Series 1-3)

Minor cast and characters 
 Tolulope Ogunmefun as Cousin Femi (Series 1-3)
 Andrew Apraku as Pastor Michael (Series 1-3)
 Lateef Lovejoy as Greg (Series 1-3)
 David Erdos as Tony (Series 2-3)

Episodes 

Three seasons have been produced so far, with a total of 50 episodes.

Season 2 premiered in the UK on channel OHTV in 2014 and on Africa Magic/M-Net in Africa.

In December 2015, it was announced that the third season of Meet the Adebanjos will launch on the multi-ethnic content service Lebara Play. The third season was made available to watch from the beginning of 2016 and included 19 new episodes, adding up to a total of 50 episodes produced.

Following the pick-up of the series by Netflix, a fourth season is currently in development.

Reception 

Meet the Adebanjos has been critically-acclaimed and recognised by a number of awarding bodies, including ZAFAA, NEL, Screen Nation Film and Television Awards, BEFFTA, and The Black Comedy Awards UK.

References

2012 British television series debuts
Black British sitcoms
Television shows set in London